Bodycote plc is a supplier of heat treatments, metal joining, hot isostatic pressing and coatings services. Based in Macclesfield, United Kingdom, it is listed on the London Stock Exchange and is a constituent of the FTSE 250 Index.

History
The Company was founded by Arthur Bodycote in Hinckley in 1923 as a textile business under the name of G.R. Bodycote Ltd. It was acquired by Slater Walker in 1951 and demerged from them in 1973.

It refocused on its present activities in the 1970s, particularly in bullet-proof and flame retardant clothing in the specialist materials sector. From 1979 onwards it made a series of acquisitions, the first of which was Blandburgh, a heat treatment business. In 1980 it went on to buy Zinc Alloy Rust Proofing Ltd, which was the beginning of its metallurgical coatings business.

In 1990 Bodycote acquired Metallurgical Testing Services Ltd (MTS) of Edinburgh from Murray International plc, laying the foundations for what would become Bodycote's materials testing business. In 2008 the materials testing division was sold to private ownership leading to the founding of the testing company Exova. In 1991 it bought HIP Ltd, a leading Hot Isostatic Processing business. In 2001 the Company bought Lindberg Corporation, the largest heat treatment business in the United States. The company changed its name from Bodycote International plc to Bodycote plc in April 2008.

Operations

The Company has two divisions:
 The Aerospace, Defence & Energy (ADE) business division serves the aerospace, defence, power generation and oil and gas industries.
 The Automotive & General Industrial (AGI) business division serves the automotive, construction, machine building, medical and transportation industries.

References

External links 
 Yahoo profile

Business services companies of the United Kingdom
Companies based in Cheshire
Technology companies established in 1923
Companies listed on the London Stock Exchange
Macclesfield
1923 establishments in England